Degana is a town municipality and headquarter to Sub-Division and Tehsil located in Nagaur district of Rajasthan, India.

Degana Railway Junction was made at a place situated equidistant from 3 nearby villages in the pre-independence era on the Jaipur-Jodhpur railway track for having a railway node for nearby Tungsten mine & also for better operational control as there in a long section of 40 km without any station in-between. With the passage of time, a Town came into being by drawing more and more dwellers and houses in next 50 years nearer to the railway station due to the obvious advantage of Rail connectivity to more significant city centers like Jaipur, Jodhpur and Bikaner. As during those 50 years, the Road connectivity & Bus services were extremely poor in that region. 

The city now has headquarters for Sub-division. Degana is 44 km From Makrana Railway station and 15 km from Gachhipura Railway station.

Demography
As of 2011 India census, Degana had a population of 34,315. Males constitute 53% of the population and females 47%. Degana has an average literacy rate of 70%, higher than the national average of 59.5%, male literacy is 75% and female literacy is 51%.

Mineral
Wolfram (Wolframite) deposits are found in Renwat Hill at Degana. In this mineral the tungstate of iron and manganese occurs, in the veins and lodes of granite and philites. A reserve of the order of 3,400 tones has been established. Until 1994 Hindustan Zinc (Vedanta Group) was mining here in collaboration with government of Rajasthan, but as the depth of mineral is now very deep it is not that economical to mine mineral from this reservoir so they decided to stop mining for a certain time and started to import.

Religious sites
The village has the temples of Ambe Mata mandir soni bhawan, Shitala Mata, Karni Mata, Chaumunda Mata, Charbhuja, Deonarayan, Shree Venkatesh Satyanarayan Temple,
Temple was inaugurated on 13 May 1994 to fulfill the dream of Late Jainarayanji Karwa By his son Shri Sriniwasji Karwa. The idols are Lord Venkatesh, Lord Satyanarayan, Goddess Laxmi and Lord Hanunman. Main functions are on the Anniversary of Temple, Shiv Mandir, Gaytari Mandir, Veer Teja ji Mandir, Dharmshala hanuman mandir etc. There is an annual cattle-fair in village from Rajathani month Asoja Krishna 1 to 10 Dashahara. Village also has got three Mosques, One Eidgaah for Muslims. Also Muslim Dargaah (Kasnau Baba - Ilahibaksh baba).

Geography
It has an average elevation of 353 metres (1161 ft).

Education
There is a Govt. Senior Secondary School with Science, Commerce and Arts faculties situated at Degana-Chandaroon Road. School was developed by Shri Bhanwar Lal Karwa, Chandarun and Hon'ble Citizens of Degana Junction and Chandaroon Village. 

Degana city has Girls school up to Senior classes and Girls school attached with Maharshi Dayanand Saraswati University for ARTS Subject situated at Sadar Bazar, Deagna Junction.

Some Schools of Degana Region:
Gayatri bal Nekeyan school
Dayanand bal niketan Sr. Sec. school

Veer teja school
Vivekanand sr school 
Blue rose school
Dayanand public school,Jaola (English medium school)
Mayur school degana
Rana International School, Ajmer Road, Degana(English Medium)

College & defence academy in degana
Govt  college degana
Dayanand college & Coaching degana
Dayanand defense academy , degana
Marwar college, nagaur fatak, degana
Sharada Mahavidyalaya offering science and Arts course.
JaiShree College is a private degree college

Transport
Degana is a town populated around a railway junction on Jaipur-Jodhpur Broad-gauge line of North-Westorn Railway. Thence it has good connectivity to Jaipur (165 km), Jodhpur(149 km), Delhi (473 km) and Bikaner (218 km) through the railway network. Its location is Latitude 26° 53' 45" N and Longitude 74° 19' 15" E.

Another railway line from Degana Junction to Ratangarh now upgraded to Broad-gauge has also elevated the importance of this town Station. This line runs through Deedwana, Ladnun, Sujangarh and joins the Bikaner-Delhi Railway line at Ratangarh. Direct trains are available on a daily and weekly basis to Mumbai, Chennai, Jaipur, Jodhpur, Jaisalmer, Bikaner, Kota, Delhi, Lucknow, Kanpur, Allahabad, Bhopal, Nagpur, Varanasi, Puri and Kolkata.

Degana is also connected to nearby towns by 1 National Highway, 2 State Highways and many less-maintained MDR (Major District Roads) but "sadly" with negligible presence of State Transport services on this network. The city falls on midway on the State Highway from Ajmer to Nagaur SH-60 and another State Highway Ajmer to Deedwana SH-59.
Recently a new National Highway Link NH-65A is constructed through this town. It is an alternate route of existing NH-65 [Pali to Ambala]. The new Link NH-65A will divert from Main NH-65 at Nimbi Jodha near Ladnun and run through Banthari, Khatu, Sanju, Langod, Degana, Idwa etc. It will be a much shorter route towards Pali for all traffic from Haryana. 

Private Buses runs from Degana to Ajmer, Nagaur, Deedwana, Merta, Makrana, Parbatsar and Jodhpur but with very unpleasant service and an oligopolistic system of bus operators running on approx hourly basis connecting most of the villages of this Sub-division.

See also
List of villages in Degana Tehsil

References

Cities and towns in Nagaur district